The star and crescent is an iconographic symbol used in various historical contexts, including as a prominent symbol of the Ottoman Empire, and in contemporary times used as a national symbol for some countries as well as recognized as a symbol of Islam. It was developed in the Greek colony of Byzantium ca. 300 BC, though it became more widely used as the royal emblem of Pontic king Mithradates VI Eupator after he incorporated Byzantium into his kingdom for a short period. 
During the 5th century, it was present in coins minted by the Persian Sassanian Empire; the symbol was represented in the coins minted across the empire throughout the Middle East for more than 400 years from the 3rd century until the fall of the Sassanians after the Muslim conquest of Persia in the 7th century. The conquering Muslim rulers kept the symbol in their coinage during the early years of the caliphate, as the coins were exact replicas of the Sassanian coins.

The symbol is the conjoined representation of a crescent and a star. Both elements have a long prior history in the iconography of the Ancient Near East as representing either the Sun and Moon or the Moon and Venus (Morning Star) (or their divine personifications). It has been suggested that the crescent actually represents Venus or even the sun during an eclipse. Coins with crescent and star symbols represented separately have a longer history, with possible ties to older Mesopotamian iconography. The star, or Sun, is often shown within the arc of the crescent (also called star in crescent, or star within crescent, for disambiguation of depictions of a star and a crescent side by side). In numismatics in particular, the term crescent and pellet is used in cases where the star is simplified to a single dot.

The combination is found comparatively rarely in late medieval and early modern heraldry. It rose to prominence with its adoption as the flag and national symbol of the Ottoman Empire and some of its administrative divisions (eyalets and vilayets) and later in the 19th-century Westernizing tanzimat (reforms). The Ottoman flag of 1844, with a white ay-yıldız (Turkish for "crescent-star") on a red background, continues to be in use as the flag of the Republic of Turkey, with minor modifications. Other states formerly part of the Ottoman Empire also used the symbol, including Libya (1951–1969 and after 2011), Tunisia (1831) and Algeria (1958). The same symbol was used in other national flags introduced during the 20th century, including the flags of Azerbaijan (1918), Pakistan (1947), Malaysia (1948), Singapore (1959), Mauritania (1959), Kashmir (1974), Uzbekistan (1991), Turkmenistan (1991) and Comoros (2001). In the latter 20th century, the star and crescent have acquired a popular interpretation as a "symbol of Islam", occasionally embraced by Arab nationalism or Islamism in the 1970s to 1980s but often rejected as erroneous or unfounded by Muslim commentators in more recent times. Unlike the cross, which is a symbol of Jesus' crucifixion in Christianity, there is no solid link that connects the star and crescent symbol with the concept of Islam. The connotation is widely believed to have come from the flag of the Ottoman Empire, whose prestige as an Islamic empire and caliphate led to the adoption of its state emblem as a symbol of Islam by association. Unicode introduced a "star and crescent" character in its Miscellaneous Symbols block, at U+262A (☪).

History

Origins and predecessors

Crescents appearing together with a star or stars are a common feature of Sumerian iconography, the crescent usually being associated with the moon god Sin (Nanna) and the star with Ishtar (Inanna, i.e. Venus), often placed alongside the sun disk of Shamash. 
In Late Bronze Age Canaan, star and crescent moon motifs are also found on Moabite name seals.
The Egyptian hieroglyphs representing "moon" (N11 N11) and "star" (N14 N14) appear in ligature, forming a star-and-crescent shape N11:N14 , as a determiner for the word for "month", .

The depiction of the crescent-and-star or "star inside crescent" as it would later develop in Bosporan Kingdom is difficult to trace to Mesopotamian art.
Exceptionally, a combination of the crescent of Sin with the five-pointed star of Ishtar, with the star placed inside the crescent as in the later Hellenistic-era symbol, placed among numerous other symbols, is found in a boundary stone of Nebuchadnezzar I (12th century BC; found in Nippur by John Henry Haynes in 1896).  An example of such an arrangement is also found in the (highly speculative) reconstruction of a fragmentary stele of Ur-Nammu (Third Dynasty of Ur) discovered in the 1920s.

Classical antiquity

Greeks and Romans

Many ancient Greek (classical and hellenistic) and Roman amulets which depict stars and crescent have been found.

Mithradates VI Eupator of Pontus (r. 	120–63 BC) used an eight rayed star with a crescent moon as his emblem. 
McGing (1986)  notes the association of the star and crescent with Mithradates VI, discussing its appearance on his coins, and its survival in the coins of the Bosporan Kingdom where "[t]he star and crescent appear on Pontic royal coins from the time of Mithradates III and seem to have had oriental significance as a dynastic badge of the Mithridatic family, or the arms of the country of Pontus."
Several possible interpretations of the emblem have been proposed. In most of these, the "star" is taken to represent the Sun. The combination of the two symbols has been taken as representing Sun and Moon (and by extension Day and Night),  the Zoroastrian Mah and Mithra, or deities arising from Greek-Anatolian-Iranian syncretism, the crescent representing  Mēn Pharnakou (the local moon god) and the "star" (Sun) representing Ahuramazda (in interpretatio graeca called Zeus Stratios)

By the late Hellenistic or early Roman period, the star and crescent motif had been associated to some degree with Byzantium. If any goddess had a connection with the walls in Constantinople, it was Hecate. Hecate had a cult in Byzantium from the time of its founding. Like Byzas in one legend, she had her origins in Thrace. Hecate was considered the patron goddess of Byzantium because she was said to have saved the city from an attack by Philip of Macedon in 340 BC by the appearance of a bright light in the sky. To commemorate the event the Byzantines erected a statue of the goddess known as the  Lampadephoros ("torch-bearer" or "torch-bringer").

Some Byzantine coins of the 1st century BC and later show the head of Artemis with bow and quiver, and feature a crescent with what appears to be a six-rayed star on the reverse.

The moon-goddess Selene is commonly depicted with a crescent moon, often accompanied by two stars (the stars represent Phosphorus, the morning star, and Hesperus, the evening star); sometimes, instead of a crescent, a lunar disc is used. Often a crescent moon rests on her brow, or the cusps of a crescent moon protrude, horn-like, from her head, or from behind her head or shoulders.

In the 2nd century, the star-within-crescent is found on the obverse side of Roman coins minted during the rule of Hadrian, Geta, Caracalla and Septimius Severus, in some cases as part of an arrangement of a crescent and seven stars, one or several of which were placed inside the crescent.

Iran (Persia) 
The star and crescent symbol appears on some coins of the Parthian vassal kingdom of Elymais in the late 1st century AD.
The same symbol is present in coins that are possibly associated with Orodes I of Parthia (1st century BC). In the 2nd century AD, some Parthian coins show a simplified "pellet within crescent" symbol.

The star and crescent motif appears on the margin of Sassanid coins in the 5th century.
Sassanid rulers also appear to have used crowns featuring a crescent,  sphere and crescent, or star and crescent.

Use of the star-and-crescent combination apparently goes back to the earlier appearance of a star and a crescent on Parthian coins, first under King Orodes II (1st century BC). In these coins, the two symbols occur separately, on either side of the king's head, and not yet in their combined star-and-crescent form.
Such coins are also found further afield in Greater Persia, by the end of the 1st century AD in a coin issues by the Western Satraps ruler Chashtana. 
This arrangement is likely inherited from its Ancient Near Eastern predecessors; the star and crescent symbols are not frequently found in Achaemenid iconography, but they are present in some cylinder seals of the Achaemenid era.

Ayatollahi (2003) attempts to connect the modern adoption as an "Islamic symbol" to Sassanid coins remaining in circulation after the Islamic conquest
 which is an analysis that stands in stark contrast to established consensus that there is no evidence for any connection of the symbol with Islam or the Ottomans prior to its adoption in Ottoman flags in the late 18th century.

Western Turkic Khaganate
Coins from the Western Turkic Khaganate had a crescent moon and a star, which held an important place in the worldview of ancient Turks and other peoples of Central Asia.

Medieval and early modern

Christian and classical heraldric usage

The crescent on its own is used in western heraldry from at least the 13th century, while the star and crescent (or "Sun and Moon") emblem is in use in medieval seals at least from the late 12th century.
The crescent in pellet symbol is used in Crusader coins of the 12th century, in some cases duplicated in the four corners of a cross, as a variant of the cross-and-crosslets ("Jerusalem cross").
Many Crusader seals and coins show the crescent and the star (or blazing Sun) on either side of the ruler's head (as in the Sassanid tradition), e.g. Bohemond III of Antioch, Richard I of England, Raymond VI, Count of Toulouse. At the same time, the star in crescent is found on the obverse of Crusader coins, e.g. in coins of the County of Tripoli minted under Raymond II or III c. 1140s–1160s show an "eight-rayed star with pellets above crescent".

The star and crescent combination appears in attributed arms from the early 14th century, possibly in a coat of arms of c. 1330, possibly attributed to John Chrysostom,
and in the Wernigeroder Wappenbuch (late 15th century) attributed to one of the three Magi, named "Balthasar of Tarsus".

Crescents (without the star) increase in popularity in early modern heraldry in Europe. Siebmachers Wappenbuch (1605) records 48 coats of arms of German families which include one or several crescents.

A star and crescent symbolizing Croatia was commonly found on 13th-century banovac coins in the Kingdom of Slavonia, with a two-barred cross symbolizing the Kingdom of Hungary.

In the late 16th century, the Korenić-Neorić Armorial shows a white star and crescent on a red field as the coat of arms of "Illyria".

The star and crescent combination remains rare prior to its adoption by the Ottoman Empire in the second half of the 18th century.

Muslim usage

While the crescent on its own is depicted as an emblem used on Islamic war flags from the medieval period, at least from the 13th century although it does not seem to have been in frequent use until the 14th or 15th century,  the star and crescent in an Islamic context is more rare in the medieval period, but may occasionally be found in depictions of flags from the 14th century onward.

Some Mughal era (17th century) round shields were decorated with a crescent or star and crescent.

Use in the Ottoman Empire

The adoption of star and crescent as the Ottoman state symbol started during the reign of Mustafa III (1757–1774) and its use became well-established during the periods of Abdul Hamid I (1774–1789) and Selim III (1789–1807).
A  from 1793 states that the ships in the Ottoman navy have that flag, and various other documents from earlier and later years mention its use. 
The ultimate source of the emblem is unclear. It is mostly derived from the star-and-crescent symbol used by the city of Constantinople in antiquity, possibly by association with the crescent design (without the star) used in Turkish flags since before 1453.

With the Tanzimat reforms in the 19th century, flags were redesigned in the style of the European armies of the day. The flag of the Ottoman Navy was made red, as red was to be the flag of secular institutions and green of religious ones. As the reforms abolished all the various flags (standards) of the Ottoman pashaliks, beyliks and emirates, a single new Ottoman national flag was designed to replace them. The result was the red flag with the white crescent moon and star, which is the precursor to the modern flag of Turkey. A plain red flag was introduced as the civil ensign for all Ottoman subjects.
The white crescent with an eight-pointed star on a red field is depicted as the flag of a "Turkish Man of War" in Colton's Delineation of Flags of All Nations (1862). Steenbergen's  of the same year shows a six-pointed star. A plate in Webster's Unabridged of 1882 shows the flag with an eight-pointed star labelled "Turkey, Man of war". The five-pointed star seems to have been present alongside these variants from at least 1857.

In addition to Ottoman imperial insignias, symbols appears on the flag of Bosnia Eyalet (1580–1867) and Bosnia Vilayet (1867–1908), as well as the flag of 1831 Bosnian revolt, while the symbols appeared on some representations of medieval Bosnian coat of arms too.

In the late 19th century, "Star and Crescent" came to be used as a metaphor for Ottoman rule in British literature.  The increasingly ubiquitous fashion of using the star and crescent symbol in the ornamentation of Ottoman mosques and minarets led to a gradual association of the symbol with Islam in general in western Orientalism. The "Red Crescent" emblem was used by volunteers of the International Committee of the Red Cross (ICRC) as early as 1877 during the Russo-Turkish War; it was officially adopted in 1929.

After the foundation of the Republic of Turkey in 1923, the new Turkish state maintained the last flag of the Ottoman Empire. Proportional standardisations were introduced in the Turkish Flag Law of May 29, 1936.
Besides the most prominent example of Turkey (see Flag of Turkey), a number of other Ottoman successor states adopted the design during the 20th century, including the Emirate of Cyrenaica and the Kingdom of Libya, Algeria, Tunisia, and the proposed Arab Islamic Republic.

Contemporary use

National flags
The Ottoman flag of 1844 with a white "ay-yıldız" (Turkish for "crescent-star") on a red background continues to be in use as the flag of the Republic of Turkey with minor modifications.

Other Ottoman successor states using the star and crescent design in their flag are 
Tunisia (1831), Libya (1951, re-introduced 2011) and Algeria (1958).
The modern emblem of Turkey shows the star outside the arc of the crescent, as it were a "realistic" depiction of a conjunction of Moon and Venus, while in the 19th century, the Ottoman star and crescent was occasionally still drawn as the star-within-crescent.
By contrast, the designs of both the flags of Algeria and Tunisia (as well as Mauritania and Pakistan) place the star within the crescent.

The same symbol was used in other national flags introduced during the 20th century, including the flags of Azerbaijan (1918, re-introduced 1991), the Rif Republic (1921), Pakistan (1947), Malaysia (1948), Mauritania (1959), 
Kashmir (1974) and the partially recognized states of the Sahrawi Arab Democratic Republic (1976) and Northern Cyprus (1983). The symbol also may represent flag of cities or emirates such as the emirate of Umm Al-Quwain.

National flags with a crescent alongside several stars:
 

National flags and coat of arms with star, crescent and other symbols:

Symbol of Islam

By the mid-20th century, the symbol came to be re-interpreted as the symbol of Islam or the Muslim community.
This symbolism was embraced by movements of Arab nationalism or Islamism in the 1970s too, such as the proposed Arab Islamic Republic (1974) and the American Nation of Islam (1973).

Cyril Glassé in his The New Encyclopedia of Islam (2001 edition, s.v. "Moon") states that "in the language of conventional symbols, the crescent and star have become the symbols of Islam as much as the cross is the symbol of Christianity."

By contrast, Crescent magazine — a religious Islamic publication — quoted without giving names that "Many Muslim scholars reject using the crescent moon as a symbol of Islam".

On February 28, 2017, it was announced by the Qira County government in Hotan Prefecture, Xinjiang, China that those who reported others for stitching the 'star and crescent moon' insignia on their clothing or personal items or having the words 'East Turkestan' on their mobile phone case, purse or other jewelry, would be eligible for cash payments.

Municipal coats of arms
The star and crescent as a traditional heraldic charge is in continued use in numerous municipal coats of arms (notably the based on the Leliwa (Tarnowski) coat of arms in the case of Polish municipalities).

Sports Club Emblems
In rugby union, Saracens F.C. incorporates the crescent and star in its crest. Drogheda United F.C., Portsmouth F.C., and S.U. Sintrense all borrow the crescent and star from their respective towns' coats of arms. Mohammedan SC in Kolkata, India also incorporates the symbol in its crest.

Other uses

See also
Star
Lunar phase
Pentagram of Venus
New Orleans Police Department

References 

Charles Boutell, "Device of Star (or Sun) and Crescent". In The Gentleman's Magazine, Volume XXXVI (New Series). London: John Nicols & Son, London, 1851, pp. 514–515

External links

Star symbols
Heraldic charges
Numismatic terminology
National symbols of Pakistan
National symbols of Turkey
National symbols of Algeria
National symbols of Tunisia
Visual motifs
Iconography
Inanna
Islamic symbols